The casting tournaments  at the 2005 World Games in Duisburg was played between 22 and 24 July. 48 athletes, from 13 nations, participated in the tournament. The casting competition took place in Sportpark Wedau.

Participating nations

Medal table

Events

Men

Women

References

External links
 International Casting Sport Federation
 Casting on IWGA website
 Results

 
2005 World Games
2005